Edward Lippincott Tilton (19 October 1861 – 5 January 1933) was an American architect, with a practice in New York City, where he was born. He specialized in the design of libraries, completing about one hundred in the U.S. and Canada, including many Carnegie libraries and structures for educational institutions.

In about 1881 Tilton abandoned a budding career in banking to work as a draftsman in the office of McKim, Mead & White, a traditional apprenticeship for which he prepared with a private tutor in architecture and which prepared him for a course of further study at the École des Beaux-Arts, Paris (1887–1890). Early commissions came through family connections; they included the casino (1891–92) in Belle Haven, an affluent shoreline community of Greenwich, Connecticut, and the Hotel Colorado in the resort of Glenwood Springs, Colorado (1891–93).

He and the partner that he met in Paris, William A. Boring, won a competition in 1897 to design the first phase of new buildings for the U.S. Immigration Station on Ellis Island in New York Harbor.  Four major buildings were all constructed to their designs before the formal partnership was amicably dissolved in 1904. The two architects continued to share an office.

He published his thoughts on library planning and construction, in Essentials in Library Planning with A.E. Bostwick and S.H Ranck (1928), and "Library Planning" posthumously published in the Journal of the Royal Institute of British Architects (1936).

Work 

Tilton worked in the partnership Boring & Tilton (1881-1904), as a solo architect, in the partnership Tilton & Githens (1916-1932), then again briefly in solo practice as consulting architect until his death.

 U.S. Immigration Station on Ellis Island in New York Harbor:  Main Building (1897–1900), Kitchen and Laundry Building (1900–01), Main Powerhouse (1900–01), and Main Hospital Building (1900–01) 
 Bayonne Public Library, Bayonne, New Jersey, 1904
 Ludington Public Library, Ludington, Michigan, 1906
 Olean Public Library, Olean, New York, 1907
 Carnegie Science Hall (renamed to Stuart Hall in 1977) at Coe College, Cedar Rapids, Iowa, 1910
 Elizabeth Public Library, Elizabeth, New Jersey, 1912
 Springfield City Library, Springfield, Massachusetts, 1912
 Sioux City Free Public Library, Sioux City, Iowa, 1913
 Carpenter Memorial Library, Manchester, New Hampshire, 1914 (with architect Edgar Allen Poe Newcomb)
 Franklin Library, Minneapolis, Minnesota, 1914
 Belmar Public Library, Belmar, New Jersey, 1914
 Bond Hall, University of Notre Dame, South Bend, Indiana, 1915
 Trenton Free Public Library (John Lambert Cadwalader addition), Trenton, New Jersey, 1915
 Peabody Library, George Peabody College for Teachers (now part of Vanderbilt University), Nashville, Tennessee, 1919
 Chester C. Corbin Public Library, Webster, Massachusetts, 1920
 Riley Hall of Art and Design, University of Notre Dame, South Bend, Indiana, 1920
 Wilmington Public Library,  Wilmington, Delaware, 1923
 Knight Memorial Library, Providence, Rhode Island, 1924
 Mount Pleasant Library, Washington DC, 1925
 McGregor Public Library, Highland Park, MI, 1926
 Currier Museum of Art, Manchester, New Hampshire, 1929
 Central Library, Enoch Pratt Free Library, Baltimore, Maryland, 1931-1933
 St. Luke's Lutheran Church, NYC, 1922
 campus of Concordia College, Bronxville, New York

Notes

External links
 

1861 births
1933 deaths

American alumni of the École des Beaux-Arts
Architects from New York City